Sandra de Pol is a Swiss former footballer who played as a defender for Bayern Munich in the Frauen-Bundesliga. She also played for FC Malters and Blue Stars Zürich in the Swiss Nationalliga, Brewton-Parker College in the NAIA and TuS Niederkirchen in the Bundesliga.

She was a member of the Switzerland national team in the 1990s.

References

External links
 

1975 births
Living people
Swiss women's footballers
Women's association football defenders
Switzerland women's international footballers
Frauen-Bundesliga players
2. Frauen-Bundesliga players
FC Bayern Munich (women) players
Swiss expatriate women's footballers
Swiss expatriate sportspeople in the United States
Expatriate women's soccer players in the United States
Swiss expatriate sportspeople in Germany
Expatriate women's footballers in Germany
1. FFC 08 Niederkirchen players